is a Japanese former athlete who specialised in the 400 metres hurdles. He competed in the 1992 Summer Olympics, in the 1996 Summer Olympics, and in the 2000 Summer Olympics. He also competed in the 1991 World Championships, in the 1995 World Championships, in the 1997 World Championships, and in the 1999 World Championships. He was a finalist at the 1995 World Championships and the first Japanese to reach the 400 metres hurdles final at the World Championships. He was the former Asian record holder in the 400 metres hurdles and a two-time Japanese Championships champion.

Competition record

1Did not finish in the semifinals

National titles
Japanese Championships
400 m hurdles: 1996, 1999

References

External links

Kazuhiko Yamazaki at JOC 

1971 births
Living people
Sportspeople from Saitama (city)
Japanese male hurdlers
Olympic male hurdlers
Olympic athletes of Japan
Athletes (track and field) at the 1992 Summer Olympics
Athletes (track and field) at the 1996 Summer Olympics
Athletes (track and field) at the 2000 Summer Olympics
Universiade medalists in athletics (track and field)
Universiade gold medalists for Japan
Competitors at the 1991 Summer Universiade
Competitors at the 1993 Summer Universiade
Competitors at the 1995 Summer Universiade
Medalists at the 1995 Summer Universiade
World Athletics Championships athletes for Japan
Japan Championships in Athletics winners

nl:Harry Schulting